Fiji competed at the 1992 Summer Olympics in Barcelona, Spain.

Competitors
The following is the list of number of competitors in the Games.

Results by event

Athletics
Men's 100m metres
Gabrieli Qoro
 Heat — 11.14 (→ did not advance)

Men's 5.000 metres
Davendra Singh
 Heat — did not start (→ did not advance)

Men's 10.000 metres
Bineshwar Prasad
 Heat — 31:46.19 (→ did not advance)

Men's 110m Hurdles
 Albert Miller
 Heats — 14.88 (→ did not advance)

Men's 400m Hurdles
Autiko Daunakamakama
 Heat — 53.90 (→ did not advance)

Men's Long Jump
Gabrieli Qoro
 Qualification — 7.22 m (→ did not advance)

Sailing
Men's Sailboard (Lechner A-390)
Tony Philp
 Final Ranking — 150.0 points (→ 10th place)

Swimming
Men's 50 m Freestyle
 Carl Probert
 Heat – 26.31 (→ did not advance, 65th place)
 Foy Gordon Chung
 Heat – 28.75 (→ did not advance, 70th place)

Men's 100 m Freestyle
 Carl Probert
 Heat – 57.25 (→ did not advance, 71st place)
 Foy Gordon Chung
 Heat – 1:03.96 (→ did not advance, 73rd place)

Men's 200 m Freestyle
 Carl Probert
 Heat – 2:04.52 (→ did not advance, 50th place)

Men's 100 m Backstroke
 Carl Probert
 Heat – 1:04.92 (→ did not advance, 50th place)

Men's 200 m Backstroke
 Carl Probert
 Heat – 2:22.54 (→ did not advance, 42nd place)

Men's 100 m Breaststroke
 Foy Gordon Chung
 Heat – 1:13.51 (→ did not advance, 54th place)

Men's 200 m Breaststroke
 Foy Gordon Chung
 Heat – 2:41.10 (→ did not advance, 50th place)

Men's 100 m Butterfly
 Carl Probert
 Heat – 1:04.10 (→ did not advance, 68th place)

Men's 200 m Individual Medley
 Carl Probert
 Heat – 2:22.09 (→ did not advance, 48th place)

Women's 50 m Freestyle
 Sharon Pickering
 Heat – 28.90 (→ did not advance, 47th place)

Women's 100 m Freestyle
 Sharon Pickering
 Heat – 1:01.42 (→ did not advance, 45th place)

Women's 200 m Freestyle
 Sharon Pickering
 Heat – 2:12.43 (→ did not advance, 34th place)

Women's 100 m Butterfly
 Sharon Pickering
 Heat – 1:06.35 (→ did not advance, 45th place)

Women's 200 m Individual Medley
 Sharon Pickering
 Heat – 2:30.11 (→ did not advance, 40th place)

References

Official Olympic Reports

Nations at the 1992 Summer Olympics
1992
Olympics